Statistics of Emperor's Cup in the 1933 season.

Overview
It was contested by 8 teams, and Tokyo OB Club won the championship.

Results

Quarterfinals
Kwansei Gakuin University 6–1 Toyama Shihan
Tokyo OB Club 2–0 Hakodate Shukyu-dan
Sendai S.C. 2–1 Shizuoka High School Club
Hiroshima Teachers 4–2 Kumamoto Shihan Shukyu-dan

Semifinals
Kwansei Gakuin University 0–2 Tokyo OB Club
Sendai S.C. 5–0 Hiroshima Teachers

Final

Tokyo OB Club 4–1 Sendai S.C.
Tokyo OB Club won the championship.

References
 NHK

Emperor's Cup
1933 in Japanese football